The State of the Nation, is a speech made annually by the President of Somaliland at a joint session of the Parliament (House of Representatives and House of Elders).  It covers the economic, social, and financial state of the country.

See also
Muse Bihi Abdi
Politics of Somaliland

References

Government of Somaliland
Politics of Somaliland